Threading may refer to:

 Thread (computing), a programming technique
 Threading (epilation), a hair removal method
 Threading (manufacturing), the process of making a screw thread
 Threading (protein sequence), a method for computational protein structure prediction
 Threaded code, another programming technique
 Threaded discussion (conversation threading), a conceptual model, and its instantiations, in digital communication, including IMs, DMs, email, Usenet, commenting utilities, web forums, and so on